Jonathan Andrew Fox  (born 30 May 1991) is a British Paralympic swimmer.

Personal life
Fox was born on 30 May 1991 in Plymouth, Devon, England. He was educated at Cornwall College, earning a BTEC in Sport and Science in 2007.

He was born with cerebral palsy and competes in the S7 Paralympic classification.

Swimming
Fox was introduced to Paralympic swimming at a Regional Disability Swimming meet in 2001.

He represented Great Britain at the 2008 Summer Paralympics held in Beijing, China. Fox won a silver medal in the 100-metre backstroke S7 event. He also finished fifth in the 100-metre freestyle, eighth in the 50-metre freestyle and ninth in the 400-metre freestyle.

In 2009 at the International Paralympic Committee (IPC) European Swimming Championships held in Reykjavík, Iceland, he won three gold medals and two silver medals. At the 2010 IPC Swimming World Championships Fox won a gold medal in the 100-metre backstroke event and a bronze in the 400-metre freestyle. In the same year he won two gold medals and two bronze at the British Championships. In 2011 Fox won three gold, a silver and two bronze medals at the European Championships in Berlin as well as two gold medals at the British Championships.

Fox was selected to compete for Great Britain at the 2012 Summer Paralympics in the 50-metre freestyle, 100-metre freestyle, 400-metre freestyle and 100-metre backstroke events in the S7 classification. In the heats of the 100 m backstroke he broke his own world record, setting a time of one minute 9.86 seconds to qualify fastest for the final. He went on to win the final in a time of one minute 10.46 seconds to take Great Britain's first swimming gold medal at the Games.

, he holds S7 world records in long course 200-metre freestyle, 800-metre freestyle, 50 metres backstroke and 100 metres backstroke events.

Honours
Fox was appointed Member of the Order of the British Empire (MBE) in the 2013 New Year Honours for services to swimming.

See also

 2012 Olympics gold post boxes in the United Kingdom

References

External links 
 
 Jonathan Fox - Montreal 2013 IPC Swimming World Championships at the International Paralympic Committee

Swimmers at the 2008 Summer Paralympics
Living people
Swimmers at the 2012 Summer Paralympics
Paralympic swimmers of Great Britain
Paralympic silver medalists for Great Britain
Sportspeople from Plymouth, Devon
1991 births
English male swimmers
Paralympic gold medalists for Great Britain
Swimmers with cerebral palsy
World record holders in paralympic swimming
People from St Stephen-in-Brannel
Members of the Order of the British Empire
Medalists at the 2008 Summer Paralympics
Medalists at the 2012 Summer Paralympics
S7-classified Paralympic swimmers
Medalists at the World Para Swimming Championships
Medalists at the World Para Swimming European Championships
Paralympic medalists in swimming
People with type 1 diabetes
British male freestyle swimmers
British male backstroke swimmers